Located in Northeast Los Angeles near the Southwest Museum, the Ziegler Estate is a historic building on Figueroa Street in the Highland Park section of Los Angeles, California. Built in 1904, the building was designed by Charles Hornbeck and Alfred P. Wilson with elements of both Queen Anne and American Craftsman architecture.  In the 1950s, Carl Dentzel, then director of the Southwest Museum, purchased it as a potential addition to the Southwest Museum Complex, which also included the Casa de Adobe and the Braun Research Library. The house is currently used as a day-care facility.

The Zeigler Estate was nominated by Charles J. Fisher and the Highland Park Heritage Trust for Los Angeles Historic Cultural designation, and was declared Monument #416 on February 21, 1989. On October 3, 2003, it was placed on the National Register of Historic Places.

See also
Los Angeles Historic-Cultural Monuments on the East and Northeast Sides
 List of Registered Historic Places in Los Angeles

References

Highland Park, Los Angeles
Houses completed in 1904
Los Angeles Historic-Cultural Monuments
Houses on the National Register of Historic Places in Los Angeles
Queen Anne architecture in California
American Craftsman architecture in California
Victorian architecture in California